Seattle Betsuin Buddhist Temple (built 1940–41) is a Japanese Jodo Shinshu Buddhist temple in Seattle, Washington, USA, and a member of the Buddhist Churches of America.

Although it was designed by Japanese American Kichio Allen Arai, the architect of record was Pierce A. Horrocks, because Arai lacked an architectural license. It replaced an earlier Seattle Buddhist Church (built 1906–1908 by Saunders & Lawton, Charles W. Saunders and George Willis Lawton) that was torn down as part of the Yesler Terrace project.

The building is a designated Seattle landmark.

See also
 
 Buddhist Churches of America
 Visalia Buddhist Church
 Walnut Grove Buddhist Church

Notes

References

External links

Seattle Buddhist Church

Japanese-American culture in Seattle
Landmarks in Seattle
Religious buildings and structures in Washington (state)
Buddhist temples in Washington (state)
Religious buildings and structures in Seattle
Buddhist Churches of America
Jōdo Shin temples
20th-century Buddhist temples